The 2019 Chicago White Sox season was the club's 120th season in Chicago and 119th in the American League. The Sox played their home games at Guaranteed Rate Field. It was the final season of gameday broadcasts on WGN-TV, bringing to a close an era of periodic White Sox free-to-air broadcasts to its fans all over the city, as beginning in 2020 the White Sox will broadcast almost all its home and away games on both NBC Sports Chicago and NBC Sports Chicago+. Although they improved on their 62-100 record from the previous season, they missed the playoffs for the 11th straight year.

Regular season

Game log

|-style=background:#fbb
|| 1 ||  March 28 || @ Royals || 3:15pm || 3–5 || Keller (1–0) || Rodón (0–1) || Boxberger (1) || 31,675 || 0–1 || L1
|-style=background:#fbb
|| 2 || March 30 || @ Royals || 1:15pm || 6–8 || Junis (1–0) || López (0–1) || Kennedy (1) || 13,533 || 0–2 || L2
|-style=background:#bfb
|| 3 || March 31 || @ Royals || 1:15pm || 6–3 || Giolito (1–0) || López (0–1) || Colomé (1) || 12,669 || 1–2 || W1
|-style=background:#fbb
|| 4 || April 1 || @ Indians || 3:10pm || 3–5 || Edwards (2–0) || Covey (0–1) || Hand (2) || 34,519 || 1–3 || L1
|-style=background:#bfb
|| 5 || April 3 || @ Indians || 12:10pm || 8–3 || Rodón (1–1) || Kluber (0–2) || — || 10,689 || 2–3 || W1
|-style=background:#bbb
|| – || April 4 || Mariners || 1:10pm ||colspan=7| Postponed (Inclement Weather, makeup date on April 5)
|-style=background:#bfb
|| 6 || April 5 || Mariners || 1:10pm || 10–8 || Burr (1–0) || Gearrin (0–1) || Colomé (2) || 32,723 || 3–3 || W2
|-style=background:#fbb
|| 7 || April 6 || Mariners || 1:10pm || 2–9 || Leake (2–0) || Giolito (1–1) || — || 31,286 || 3–4 || L1
|-style=background:#fbb
|| 8 || April 7 || Mariners || 1:10pm || 5–12 || LeBlanc (2–0) || Nova (0–1) || — || 12,509 || 3–5 || L2
|-style=background:#fbb
|| 9 || April 8 || Rays || 1:10pm || 1–5 || Snell (2–1) || Rodón (1–2) || Wood (1) || 11,734 || 3–6 || L3
|-style=background:#fbb
|| 10 || April 9 || Rays || 1:10pm || 5–10 || Morton (2–0) || Santana (0–1) || — || 10,799 || 3–7 || L4
|-style=background:#fbb
|| 11 || April 10 || Rays || 1:10pm || 1–9 || Glasnow (3–0) || López (0–2) || Beeks (1) || 11,107 || 3–8 || L5
|-style=background:#bfb
|| 12 || April 12 || @ Yankees || 6:05pm || 9–6 (7) || Giolito (2–1) || Happ (0–2) || Jones (1) || 40,913 || 4–8 || W1
|-style=background:#fbb
|| 13 || April 13 || @ Yankees || 12:05pm || 0–4 || Germán (3–0) || Nova (0–2) || — || 41,176 || 4–9 || L1
|-style=background:#bfb
|| 14 || April 14 || @ Yankees || 12:05pm || 5–2 || Rodón (2–2) || Tanaka (1–1) || Colomé (3) || 40,104 || 5–9 || W1
|-style=background:#bfb
|| 15 || April 15 || Royals || 7:10pm || 5–4 || Bañuelos (1–0) || Boxberger (0–3) || Colomé (4) || 12,553 || 6–9 || W2
|-style=background:#bfb
|| 16 || April 16 || Royals || 7:10pm || 5–1 || López (1–2) || López (0–2) || — || 13,583 || 7–9 || W3
|-style=background:#fbb
|| 17 || April 17 || Royals || 1:10pm || 3–4 (10) || Peralta (2–1) || Jones (0–1) || Barlow (1) || 14,358 || 7–10 || L1
|-style=background:#fbb
|| 18 || April 18 || @ Tigers || 12:10pm || 7–9 || VerHagen (1–0) || Fulmer (0–1) || Greene (9) || 14,320 || 7–11 || L2
|-style=background:#bfb
|| 19 || April 19 || @ Tigers || 6:10pm || 7–3 || Rodón (3–2) || Zimmermann (0–3) || — || 14,568 || 8–11 || W1
|-style=background:#bbb
|| – || April 20 || @ Tigers || 12:10pm ||colspan=7| Postponed (Rain, makeup date on August 6)
|-style=background:#fbb
|| 20 || April 21 || @ Tigers || 12:10pm || 3–4 || Norris (1–0) || López (1–3) ||  Greene (10) || 15,686 || 8–12 || L1
|-style=background:#bfb
|| 21 || April 22 || @ Orioles || 6:05pm || 12–2 || Fry (1–0) || Hess (1–4) || — || 8,555 || 9–12 || W1
|-style=background:#fbb
|| 22 || April 23 || @ Orioles || 6:05pm || 1–9 || Cashner (4-1) || Nova (0-3) || — || 8,953 || 9–13 || L1
|-style=background:#fbb
|| 23 || April 24 || @ Orioles || 6:05pm || 3–4 || Means (3-2) || Santana (0-2) || Givens (1) || 10,555 || 9–14 || L2
|-style=background:#bfb
|| 24 || April 26 || Tigers || 7:10pm || 12–11 || Colomé (1–0) || Jiménez (1–1) || — || 18,016 || 10–14 ||W1
|-style=background:#bbb
|| – || April 27 || Tigers || 6:10pm ||colspan=7| Postponed (Inclement Weather, makeup date on July 3)
|-style=background:#bfb
|| 25 || April 28 || Tigers || 1:10pm || 4–1 || López (2–3) || Boyd (2–2) || Colomé (5) || 14,539 || 11–14 || W2
|-style=background:#bfb
|| 26 || April 29 || Orioles || 7:10pm || 5–3 || Bañuelos (2–0) || Means (3–3) || Colomé (6) || 14,717 || 12–14 ||W3
|-style=background:#bbb
|| – || April 30 || Orioles || 7:10pm ||colspan=7| Postponed (Inclement Weather, makeup date on May 1)
|-

|-style=background:#fbb
|| 27 || May 1 || Orioles || 3:10pm || 4–5 || Kline (1–0) || Herrera (0–1) || Givens (2) || TBA G2 || 12–15 || L1
|-style=background:#bfb
|| 28 || May 1 || Orioles || 7:30pm || 7–6 || Vieira (1–0) || Phillips (0–1) || — || 14,781 || 13–15 || W1
|-style=background:#bfb
|| 29 || May 2 || Red Sox || 7:10pm || 6–4 || Fulmer (1–1) || Brasier (1–1) || — || 15,118 || 14–15 || W1
|-style=background:#fbb
|| 30 || May 3 || Red Sox || 7:10pm || 1–6 || Sale (1–5) || López (2–4) || — || 17,504 || 14–16 || L1
|-style=background:#fbb
|| 31 || May 4 || Red Sox || 6:10pm || 2–15 || Rodríguez (3–2) || Bañuelos (2–1) || — || 30,068 || 14–17 || L2
|-style=background:#fbb
|| 32 || May 5 || Red Sox || 1:10pm || 2–9 || Workman (2–1) || Herrera (0–2) || — || 36,553 || 14–18 || L3
|-style=background:#bfb
|| 33 || May 6 || @ Indians || 5:10pm || 9–1 || Nova (1–3) || Bauer (4–2) || — || 12,745 || 15–18 || W1
|-style=background:#bfb
|| 34 || May 7 || @ Indians || 5:10pm || 2–0 || Giolito (3–1) || Rodríguez (0–2) || Colomé (7) || 12,961 || 16–18 || W2
|-style=background:#fbb
|| 35 || May 8 || @ Indians || 5:10pm || 3–5 || Hand (2–1) || Fry (1–1) || — || 12,519 || 16–19 || L1
|-style=background:#fbb
|| 36 || May 9 || @ Indians || 12:10pm || 0–5 (6) || Carrasco (3–3) || Bañuelos (2–2) || — || 13,247 || 16–20 || L2
|-style=background:#fbb
|| 37 || May 10 || @ Blue Jays || 6:07pm || 3–4 || Biagini (2–1) || Covey (0–2) || Giles (9) || 20,402 || 16–21 || L3
|-style=background:#bfb
|| 38 || May 11 || @ Blue Jays || 2:07pm || 7–2 || Nova (2–3) || Stroman (1–6) || — || 24,563 || 17–21 || W1
|-style=background:#bfb
|| 39 || May 12 || @ Blue Jays || 12:07pm || 5–1 || Giolito (4–1) || Sanchez (3–4) || — || 24,222 || 18–21 || W2
|-style=background:#bfb
|| 40 || May 13 || Indians || 7:10pm || 5–2 || López (3–4) || Bieber (2–2) || Colomé (8) || 16,471 || 19–21 || W3
|-style=background:#fbb
|| 41 || May 14 || Indians || 1:10pm || 0–9 || Carrasco (4–3) || Bañuelos (2–3) || — || 18,823 || 19–22 || L1
|-style=background:#bfb
|| 42 || May 16 || Blue Jays || 7:10pm || 4–2 || Herrera (1–2) || Law (0–1) || Colomé (9) || 20,119 || 20–22 || W1
|-style=background:#fbb
| 43 || May 17 || Blue Jays || 7:10pm || 2–10 || Gaviglio (3–0) || Nova (2–4) || Guerra (1) || 17,078 || 20–23 || L1
|-style=background:#bfb
|| 44 || May 18 || Blue Jays || 1:10pm || 4–1 (5) || Giolito (5–1) || Feierabend (0–1) || — || 22,908 || 21–23 || W1
|-style=background:#fbb
|| 45 || May 19 || Blue Jays || 1:10pm || 2–5 || Hudson (3–1) || Herrera (1–3) || Giles (10) || 18,605 || 21–24 || L1
|-style=background:#fbb
|| 46 || May 20 || @ Astros || 7:10pm || 0–3 || Peacock (5–2) || Burr (1–1) || Osuna (12) || 24,364 || 21–25 || L2
|-style=background:#fbb
|| 47 || May 21 || @ Astros || 7:10pm || 1–5 || Verlander (8–1) || Covey (0–3) || — || 31,392 || 21–26 || L3
|-style=background:#bfb
|| 48 || May 22 || @ Astros || 7:10pm || 9–4 || Nova (3–4) || Cole (4–5) || — || 30,237 || 22–26 || W1
|-style=background:#bfb
|| 49 || May 23 || @ Astros || 7:10pm || 4–0 || Giolito (6–1) || Martin (1–1) || — || 26,073 || 23–26 || W2
|-style=background:#fbb
|| 50 || May 24 || @ Twins || 7:10pm || 4–11 || Berríos (7–2) || López (3–5) || — || 29,638 || 23–27 || L1
|-style=background:#fbb
|| 51 || May 25 || @ Twins || 1:10pm || 1–8 || Gibson (5–2) || Bañuelos (2–4) || — || 39,139 || 23–28 || L2
|-style=background:#fbb
|| 52 || May 26 || @ Twins || 1:10pm || 0–7 || Odorizzi (7–2) || Covey (0–4) || — || 39,913 || 23–29 || L3
|-style=background:#bbb
|| 53 || May 27 || Royals || 1:10pm ||colspan=8| Suspended (inclement weather, continuation scheduled for May 28)
|-style=background:#bfb
|| 53 || May 28 || Royals || 7:10pm || 2–1 || Colomé (2–0) || Diekman (0–2) || — || 13,842 || 24–29 || W1
|-style=background:#bfb
|| 54 || May 28 || Royals || 7:10pm || 4–3 || Giolito (7–1) || Keller (3–6) || Colomé (10) || 13,842 || 25–29 || W2
|-style=background:#bfb
|| 55 || May 29 || Royals || 7:10pm || 8–7 || Herrera (2–3) || Kennedy (0–2) || Colomé (11) || 16,167 || 26–29 || W3
|-style=background:#bfb
|| 56 || May 30 || Indians || 7:10pm || 10–4 || Bañuelos (3–4) || Carrasco (4–6) || — || 22,182 || 27–29 || W4
|-style=background:#bfb
|| 57 || May 31 || Indians || 7:10pm || 6–1 || Covey (1–4) || Bauer (4–5) || — || 21,652 || 28–29 || W5
|-

|-style=background:#fbb
|| 58 || June 1 || Indians || 1:10pm || 2–5 || Pérez (1–0) || Nova (3–5) || Hand (16) || 25,873 || 28–30 || L1
|-style=background:#bfb
|| 59 || June 2 || Indians || 1:10pm || 2–0 || Giolito (8–1) || Plesac (0–1) || Colomé (12) || 26,453 || 29–30 || W1
|-style=background:#fbb
|| 60 || June 4 || @ Nationals || 6:05pm || 5–9 || Strasburg (6–3) || López (3–6) || Doolittle (13) || 32,513 || 29–31 || L1
|-style=background:#fbb
|| 61 || June 5 || @ Nationals || 12:05pm || 4–6 || Doolittle (4–1) || Colomé (2–1) || — || 28,910 || 29–32 || L2
|-style=background:#fbb
|| 62 || June 7 || @ Royals || 7:15pm || 4–6 || Boxberger (1–3) || Fry (1–2) || Kennedy (4) || 24,744 || 29–33 || L3
|-style=background:#bfb
|| 63 || June 8 || @ Royals || 1:15pm || 2–0 || Giolito (9–1) || Keller (3–8) || Colomé (13) || 20,889 || 30–33 || W1
|-style=background:#bfb
|| 64 || June 9 || @ Royals || 1:15pm || 5–2 || López (4–6) || Sparkman (1–2) || — || 22,501 || 31–33 || W2
|-style=background:#fbb
|| 65 || June 10 || Nationals || 7:10pm || 1–12 || Sánchez (2–6) || Despaigne (0–1) || — || 16,305 || 31–34 || L1
|-style=background:#bfb
|| 66 || June 11 || Nationals || 7:10pm || 7–5 || Marshall (1–0) || Corbin (5–5) || Colomé (14) || 16,970 || 32–34 || W1
|-style=background:#bfb
|| 67 || June 13 || Yankees || 7:10pm || 5–4 || Marshall (2–0) || Ottavino (2–2) || Bummer (1) || 25,311 || 33–34 || W2
|-style=background:#bfb
|| 68 || June 14 || Yankees || 7:10pm || 10–2 || Giolito (10–1) || Sabathia (3–4) || — || 31,438 || 34–34 || W3
|-style=background:#fbb
|| 69 || June 15 || Yankees || 6:10pm || 4–8 || Cortes Jr. (1–0) || López (4–7) || — || 36,074 || 34–35 || L1
|-style=background:#fbb
|| 70 || June 16 || Yankees || 1:10pm || 3–10 || Paxton (4–3) || Despaigne (0–2) || — || 37,277 || 34–36 || L2
|-style=background:#bfb
|| 71 || June 18 || @ Cubs || 7:05pm || 3–1 || Marshall (3–0) || Strop (1–3) || Colomé (15) || 41,192 || 35–36 || W1
|-style=background:#fbb
|| 72 || June 19 || @ Cubs || 7:05pm || 3–7 || Lester (6–5) || Giolito (10–2) || — || 39,776 || 35–37 || L1
|-style=background:#bfb
|| 73 || June 21 || @ Rangers || 7:05pm || 5–4  || Herrera (3–3) || Kelley (3–2) || Colomé (16) || 29,333 || 36–37 || W1
|-style=background:#fbb
|| 74 || June 22 || @ Rangers || 8:05pm || 5–6 || Lynn (9–4) || Marshall (3–1) || Martin (3) || 33,582 || 36–38 || L1
|-style=background:#fbb
|| 75 || June 23 || @ Rangers || 2:05pm || 4–7 || Sampson (6–4) || Nova (3–6) || Kelley (10) || 21,917 || 36–39 || L2
|-style=background:#fbb
|| 76 || June 24 || @ Red Sox || 6:10pm || 5–6 || Workman (7–1) || Fry (1–3) || — || 36,117 || 36–40 || L3
|-style=background:#fbb
|| 77 || June 25 || @ Red Sox || 6:10pm || 3–6 || Price (5–2) || Ruiz (0–1) || Workman (3) || 34,470 || 36–41 || L4
|-style=background:#bfb
|| 78 || June 26 || @ Red Sox || 12:05pm || 8–7 || Colomé (3–1) || Barnes (3–3) || — || 36,823 || 37–41 || W1
|-style=background:#bfb
|| 79 || June 28 || Twins || 7:10pm || 6–4 || Detwiler (1–0) || Berríos (8–4) || Colomé (17) || 28,218 || 38–41 || W2
|-style=background:#fbb
|| 80 || June 29 || Twins || 3:12pm || 3–10 || Pineda (5–4) || Nova (3–7) || — || 27,908 || 38–42 || L1
|-style=background:#bfb
|| 81 || June 30 || Twins || 1:10pm || 4–3 || Giolito (11–2) || Thorpe (0–1) || Colomé (18) || 27,244 || 39–42 || W1
|-

|-style=background:#bbb
|| — || July 2 || Tigers || 7:10pm ||colspan=8| Postponed (Inclement Weather, makeup date on September 27)
|-style=background:#bfb
|| 82 || July 3 || Tigers || 1:10pm || 7–5 || Cease (1–0) || Norris (2–8) || Colomé (19) || 26,023 || 40–42 || W2
|-style=background:#bfb
|| 83 || July 3 || Tigers || 7:10pm || 9–6  || Ruiz (1–1) || Ramirez (3–3) || — || 23,161 || 41–42 || W3
|-style=background:#fbb
|| 84 || July 4 || Tigers || 1:10pm || 5–11 ||  Boyd (6–6) || López (4–8) || — || 25,617 || 41–43 || L1
|-style=background:#fbb
|| 85 || July 6 || Cubs || 6:15pm || 3–6 || Lester (8–6) || Giolito (11–3) || Kimbrel (2) || 38,634 || 41–44 || L2
|-style=background:#bfb
|| 86 || July 7 || Cubs || 1:10pm || 3–1 || Nova (4–7) || Hendricks (7–7) || Colomé (20) || 38,554 || 42–44 || W1
|-style=background:#bbbfff
|| — || July 9 || colspan="10"|90th All-Star Game in Cleveland, OH
|-style=background:#fbb
|| 87 || July 12 || @ Athletics || 9:07pm || 1–5 || Fiers (9–3) || Nova (4–8) || Hendriks (6) || 18,504 || 42–45 || L1
|-style=background:#fbb
|| 88 || July 13 || @ Athletics || 3:07pm || 2–13 || Bassitt (6–4) || Covey (1–5) || — || 22,222 || 42–46 || L2
|-style=background:#fbb
|| 89 || July 14 || @ Athletics || 3:07pm || 2–3 || Hendriks (4–0) || Fry (1–4) || — || 20,350 || 42–47 || L3
|-style=background:#fbb
|| 90 || July 15 || @ Royals || 7:15pm || 2–5 || Junis (5–8) || Giolito (11–4) || Kennedy (14) || 16,006 || 42–48 || L4
|-style=background:#fbb
|| 91 || July 16 || @ Royals || 7:15pm || 0–11 || Sparkman (3–5) || Cease (1–1) || — || 16,557 || 42–49 || L5
|-style=background:#fbb
|| 92 || July 17 || @ Royals || 7:15pm || 5–7 || Duffy (4–5) || Nova (4–9) || Kennedy (15) || 14,340 || 42–50 || L6
|-style=background:#fbb
|| 93 || July 18 || @ Royals || 12:15pm || 5–6 || Keller (6–9) || Detwiler (1–1) || Kennedy (16) || 13,157 || 42–51 || L7
|-style=background:#bfb
|| 94 || July 19 || @ Rays || 6:10pm || 9–2 || López (5–8) || McKay (1–1) || — || 16,971 || 43–51 || W1
|-style=background:#bfb
|| 95 || July 20 || @ Rays || 5:10pm || 2–1  || Fry (2–4) || Kolarek (3–3) || Colomé (21) || 16,338 || 44–51 || W2
|-style=background:#fbb
|| 96 || July 21 || @ Rays || 12:10pm || 2–4 || Snell (6–7) || Cease (1–2) || Kolarek (1) || 14,987 || 44–52 || L1
|-style=background:#bfb
|| 97 || July 22 || Marlins || 7:10pm || 9–1 || Nova (5–9) || Richards (3–12) || — || 14,471 || 45–52 || W1
|-style=background:#fbb
|| 98 || July 23 || Marlins || 7:10pm || 1–5 || Smith (6–4) || Covey (1–6) || — || 14,043 || 45–53 || L1
|-style=background:#fbb
|| 99 || July 24 || Marlins || 7:10pm || 0–2 || Gallen (1–2) || López (5–9) || Romo (17) || 19,098 || 45–54 || L2
|-style=background:#fbb
|| 100 || July 25 || Twins || 7:10pm || 3–10 || Berríos (9–5) || Giolito (11–5) || — || 22,087 || 45–55 || L3
|-style=background:#fbb
|| 101 || July 26 || Twins || 7:10pm || 2–6 || Pineda (7–5) || Cease (1–3) || — || 22,602 || 45–56 || L4
|-style=background:#bfb
|| 102 || July 27 || Twins || 6:10pm || 5–1 || Nova (6–9) || Pérez (8–4) || — || 34,085 || 46–56 || W1
|-style=background:#fbb
|| 103 || July 28 || Twins || 1:10pm || 1–11 || Gibson (10–4) || Covey (1–7) || — ||  27,595 || 46–57 || L1
|-style=background:#fbb
|| 104 || July 30 || Mets || 7:10pm || 2–5  || Gsellman (2–2) || Ruiz (1–2) || — || 15,947 || 46–58 || L2
|-style=background:#fbb
|| 105 || July 31 || Mets || 7:10pm || 2–4 || Wilson (2–1) || Colomé (3–2) || Díaz (24) || 25,812 || 46–59 || L3
|-

|-style=background:#fbb
|| 106 || August 1 || Mets || 1:10pm || 0-4 || Wheeler (8-6)  || Cease (1-4) || — || 23,477 || 46-60 || L4
|-style=background:#bfb
|| 107 || August 2 || @ Phillies || 6:05pm || 4–3  || Osich (1–0) || Quinn (0–1) || — || 26,635 || 47–60 || W1
|-style=background:#fbb
|| 108 || August 3 || @ Phillies || 6:05pm || 2–3 || Nola (10–2) || Detwiler (1–2) || Pivetta (1) || 32,647 || 47–61 || L1
|-style=background:#bfb
|| 109 || August 4 || @ Phillies || 12:05pm || 10–5 || López (6–9) || Smyly (2–6) || — || 31,562 || 48–61 || W1
|-style=background:#bfb
|| 110 || August 5 || @ Tigers || 6:10pm || 7–4 || Giolito (12–5) || Soto (0–5) || — || 16,942 || 49–61 || W2
|-style=background:#bfb
|| 111 || August 6 || @ Tigers || 12:10pm || 5–3 || Cease (2–4) || Norris (3–9) || Colomé (22) || 18,455 || 50–61 || W3
|-style=background:#fbb
|| 112 || August 6 || @ Tigers || 6:10pm || 6–10 || VerHagen (2–2) || Santiago (1–1) || — || 16,367 || 50–62 || L1
|-style=background:#bfb
|| 113 || August 7 || @ Tigers || 12:10pm || 8–1 || Nova (7–9) || Alexander (0–3) || — || 17,444 || 51–62 || W1
|-style=background:#fbb
|| 114 || August 9 || Athletics || 2:10pm || 0–7 || Fiers (11–3) || Detwiler (1–3) || — || 18,318 || 51–63 || L1
|-style=background:#bfb
|| 115 || August 10 || Athletics || 6:10pm || 3–2 || López (7–9) || Roark (7–8) || Colomé (23) || 27,026 || 52–63 || W1
|-style=background:#fbb
|| 116 || August 11 || Athletics || 1:10pm || 0–2 || Bassitt (8–5) || Giolito (12–6) || Hendriks (12) || 30,951 || 52–64 || L1
|-style=background:#bbb
|| — || August 12 || Astros || 7:10pm || colspan=7| Postponed (Inclement Weather, makeup date on August 13) 
|-style=background:#fbb
|| 117 || August 13 || Astros || 3:40pm || 2–6 || Greinke (12–4) || Cease (2–5) || — || N/A || 52–65 || L2
|-style=background:#bfb
|| 118 || August 13 || Astros || 7:10pm || 4–1 || Nova (8–9) || Devenski (2–1) || — || 19,559 || 53–65 || W1
|-style=background:#bfb
|| 119 || August 14 || Astros || 1:10pm || 13–9 || Colomé (4–2) || Pressly (2–3) || — || 18,899 || 54–65 || W2
|-style=background:#fbb
|| 120 || August 15 || @ Angels || 9:07pm || 7–8 || Heaney (2–3) || López (7–10) || Robles (17) || 33,533 || 54–66 || L1
|-style=background:#bfb
|| 121 || August 16 || @ Angels || 9:07pm || 7–2 || Giolito (13–6) || Sandoval (0–1) || — || 39,206 || 55–66 || W1
|-style=background:#fbb
|| 122 || August 17 || @ Angels || 8:07pm || 5–6 || Cole (3–4) || Marshall (3–2) || Robles (18) || 39,419 || 55–67 || L1
|-style=background:#fbb
|| 123 || August 18 || @ Angels || 3:07pm || 2–9 || Canning (5–6) || Cease (2–6) || — || 35,436 || 55–68 || L2
|-style=background:#bfb
|| 124 || August 19 || @ Twins || 7:10pm || 6–4 || Nova (9–9) || Gibson (11–6) || Colomé (24) || 25,564 || 56–68 || W1
|-style=background:#fbb
|| 125 || August 20 || @ Twins || 7:10pm || 4–14 || Pineda (9–5) || López (7–11) || — || 26,798 || 56–69 || L1
|-style=background:#bfb
|| 126 || August 21 || @ Twins || 12:10pm || 4–0 || Giolito (14–6) || Odorizzi (13–6) || — || 31,389 || 57–69 || W1
|-style=background:#bfb
|| 127 || August 22 || Rangers || 7:10pm || 6–1 || Detwiler (2–3) || Jurado (6–10) || — || 18,563 || 58–69 || W2
|-style=background:#bfb
|| 128 || August 23 || Rangers || 7:10pm || 8–3 || Cease (3–6) || Lynn (14–9) || — || 27,016 || 59–69 || W3
|-style=background:#fbb
|| 129 || August 24 || Rangers || 6:10pm || 0–4 || Allard (2–0) || Nova (9–10) || — || 26,454 || 59–70 || L1
|-style=background:#bfb
|| 130 || August 25 || Rangers || 1:10pm || 2–0 || López (8–11) || Burke (0–1) || Colomé (25) || 25,553 || 60–70 || W1
|-style=background:#fbb
|| 131 || August 27 || Twins || 7:10pm || 1–3 || Pineda (10–5) || Giolito (14–7) || Rogers (21) || 12,175 || 60–71 || L1
|-style=background:#fbb
|| 132 || August 28 || Twins || 7:10pm || 2–8 || Odorizzi (14–6) || Detwiler (2–4) || — || 16,802 || 60–72 || L2
|-style=background:#fbb
|| 133 || August 29 || Twins || 1:10pm || 5–10 || Berríos (11–7) || Cease (3–7) || Dobnak (1) || 15,886 || 60–73 || L3
|-style=background:#fbb
|| 134 || August 30 || @ Braves || 6:20pm || 7–10 || Fried (15–4) || Nova (9–11) || Melancon (7) || 39,098 || 60–74 || L4
|-style=background:#fbb
|| 135 || August 31 || @ Braves || 6:20pm || 5–11 || Keuchel (6–5) || López (8–12) || — || 36,664 || 60–75 || L5
|-

|-style=background:#fbb
|| 136 || September 1 || @ Braves || 4:10pm || 3–5 || Teherán (9–8) || Giolito (14–8) || Melancon (8) || 41,397 || 60–76 || L6
|-style=background:#fbb
|| 137 || September 2 || @ Indians || 6:10pm || 3–11 || Civale (3–3) || Detwiler (2–5) || — || 16,149 || 60–77 || L7
|-style=background:#bfb
|| 138 || September 3 || @ Indians || 6:10pm || 6–5 || Marshall (4–2) || Carrasco (4–7) || Colomé (26) || 17,397 || 61–77 || W1
|-style=background:#fbb
|| 139 || September 4 || @ Indians || 6:10pm || 6–8 || Bieber (13–7) || Nova (9–12) || Wittgren (4) || 25,488 || 61–78 || L1
|-style=background:#bfb
|| 140 || September 5 || @ Indians || 12:10pm || 7–1 || López (9–12) || Plesac (7–6) || — || 18,913 || 62–78 || W1
|-style=background:#fbb
|| 141 || September 6 || Angels || 7:10pm || 4–5 || Robles (5–0) || Colomé (4–3) || — || 20,026 || 62–79 || L1
|-style=background:#fbb
|| 142 || September 7 || Angels || 6:10pm || 7–8 || Heaney (4–4) || Covey (1–8) || Robles (20) || 25,230 || 62–80 || L2
|-style=background:#bfb
|| 143 || September 8 || Angels || 1:10pm || 5–1 || Osich (2–0) || Barría (4–8) || — || 22,681 || 63–80 || W1
|-style=background:#bfb
|| 144 || September 10 || Royals || 7:10pm || 7–3 || Nova (10–12) || Junis (9–13) || — || 15,196 || 64–80 || W2
|-style=background:#fbb
|| 145 || September 11 || Royals || 7:10pm || 6–8 || Sparkman (4–11) || López (9–13) || Kennedy (28) || 14,385 || 64–81 || L1
|-style=background:#fbb
|| 146 || September 12 || Royals || 1:10pm || 3–6 || López (4–7) || Giolito (14–9) || Kennedy (29) || 13,838 || 64–82 || L2
|-style=background:#bfb
|| 147 || September 13 || @ Mariners || 9:10pm || 9–7 || Osich (3–0) || Kikuchi (6–10) || Colomé (27) || 17,255 || 65–82 || W1
|-style=background:#fbb
|| 148 || September 14 || @ Mariners || 8:10pm || 1–2  || Magill (5–2) || Colomé (4–4) || — || 26,063 || 65–83 || L1
|-style=background:#fbb
|| 149 || September 15 || @ Mariners || 3:10pm || 10–11 || Adams (2–2) || Ruiz (1–3) || — || 17,091 || 65–84 || L2
|-style=background:#fbb
|| 150 || September 16 || @ Twins || 6:40pm || 3–5 || Berríos (13–8) || López (9–14) || Rogers (27) || 21,850 || 65–85 || L3
|-style=background:#fbb
|| 151 || September 17 || @ Twins || 6:40pm || 8–9  || Harper (4–2) || Ruiz (1–4) || — || 22,518 || 65–86 || L4
|-style=background:#bfb
|| 152 || September 18 || @ Twins || 6:40pm || 3–1 || Fry (3–4) || Odorizzi (14–7) || Colomé (28) || 23,759 || 66–86 || W1
|-style=background:#bfb
|| 153 || September 20 || @ Tigers || 6:10pm || 10–1 || Cease (4–7) || Zimmermann (1–12) || — || 15,265 || 67–86 || W2
|-style=background:#bfb
|| 154 || September 21 || @ Tigers || 5:10pm || 5–3 || Nova (11–12) || Alexander (1–4) || Colomé (29) || 16,891 || 68–86 || W3
|-style=background:#fbb
|| 155 || September 22 || @ Tigers || 12:10pm || 3–6 || Boyd (9–11) || López (9–15) || Jiménez (8) || 16,157 || 68–87 || L1
|-style=background:#fbb
|| 156 || September 24 || Indians || 7:10pm || 0–11 || Clevinger (13–3) || Fulmer (1–2) || — || 13,940 || 68–88 || L2
|-style=background:#bfb
|| 157 || September 25 || Indians || 7:10pm || 8–3 || Detwiler (3–5) || Bieber (15–8) || Colomé (30) || 15,980 || 69–88 || W1
|-style=background:#bfb
|| 158 || September 26 || Indians || 7:10pm || 8–0 || Osich (4–0) ||  Civale (3–4) || — || 16,273 || 70–88 || W2
|-style=background:#bbb
|| — || September 27 || Tigers || 1:10pm ||colspan=7| Cancelled (Inclement Weather)
|-style=background:#bbb
|| — || September 27 || Tigers || 7:10pm ||colspan=7| Postponed (Inclement Weather, makeup date on September 28)
|-style=background:#bfb
|| 159 || September 28 || Tigers || 2:40pm || 7–1 || López (10–15) || Boyd (9–12) || — || N/A || 71–88 || W3
|-style=background:#fbb
|| 160 || September 28 || Tigers || 6:00pm || 3–4 || Farmer (6–6) || Colomé (4–5) || Jiménez (9) || 25,552 || 71–89 || L1
|-style=background:#bfb
|| 161 || September 29 || Tigers || 2:10pm || 5–3 || Cordero (1–1) || Turnbull (3–17) || Herrera (1) || 19,534 || 72–89 || W1
|-

|- style="text-align:center;"
| Legend:       = Win       = Loss       = PostponementBold = White Sox team member

Season standings

American League Central

American League Wild Card

Record against opponents

Roster

Farm system

References

External links
2019 Chicago White Sox at Baseball Reference
2019 Chicago White Sox season Official Site
2019 Chicago White Sox season at ESPN

Chicago White Sox seasons
Chicago White Sox
White Sox
White Sox
White Sox